Esaias Tegnér (– ) was a Swedish writer, professor of the Greek language, and bishop. He was during the 19th century regarded as the father of modern poetry in Sweden, mainly through the national romantic epic Frithjof's Saga. He has been called Sweden's first modern man. Much is known about him, and he also wrote openly about himself.

Early life 
His father was a pastor, and his grandparents on both sides were peasants. His father, whose name had been Esaias Lucasson, took the surname of Tegnérus—altered by his fifth son, the poet, to Tegnér—from the village of Tegnaby in the province of Småland, where he was born. In 1792 Tegnérus died.

In 1799 Esaias Tegnér, hitherto educated in the country, entered Lund University, where he graduated in philosophy in 1802, and continued as tutor until 1810, when he was elected Greek lecturer. In 1806 he married Anna Maria Gustava Myhrman, to whom he had been attached since his earliest youth. In 1812 he was named professor, and continued to work as a lecturer in Lund until 1824, when he was made Bishop of Växjö. He remained in Växjö until his death, twenty-two years later.

He was comparatively slow in development. His first great success was a dithyrambic war-song for the army of 1808. In 1811 his patriotic poem Svea won the great prize of the Swedish Academy, and made him famous. In the same year was founded in Stockholm the Gothic League (Götiska förbundet), a sort of club of young and patriotic men of letters, of whom Tegnér quickly became the chief. The club published a magazine, entitled Iduna, in which it printed a great deal of excellent poetry, and ventilated its views, particularly as regards the study of Icelandic literature and old Norse history. Tegnér, Geijer, Afzelius, and Nicander became the most famous members of the Gothic League.

Lund poems 

The majority of the many poems from Tegnér in Lund are short, but some are in lyrics. They are still shown to visitors as the Tegnér museum. His celebrated Song to the Sun dates from 1817. He completed three poems of a more ambitious character, on which his fame chiefly rests. Of these, the romance of Axel (1822) and the delicately chiselled idyl of Nattvardsbarnen (1820), translated by Longfellow, take a secondary place in comparison with Tegnér's masterpiece of worldwide fame. In 1819 he also became a member of the distinguished Swedish Academy, on seat 8.

Claim to recognition 
In 1820 he published in Iduna fragments of an epic on which he was working: Frithjof's saga. In 1822 he published five more cantos, and in 1825 the entire poem. Already before its last canto it was famous throughout Europe; the aged Goethe took up his pen to commend to his countrymen this alte, kräftige, gigantischbarbarische Dichtart and desired Amalie von Imhoff to translate it into German. This romantic paraphrase of an ancient saga was composed in twenty-four cantos, all differing in verse form, modeled somewhat, on an earlier Danish masterpiece,  Helge of Oehlenschläger.

Frithjof's saga was during the 19th century the best known of all Swedish productions. It is said to have been translated twenty-two times into English, twenty times into German, and once at least into every European language. It is far from satisfying the demands of more recent antiquarian research, but it still is allowed to give the freshest existing impression, in imaginative form, of life in early Scandinavia. A section of the work was later used by Max Bruch as the basis for his 1864 cantata Frithjof.

Later life 

The period of the publication of Frithjof's saga (1825) was the critical epoch of his career. It made him one of the most famous poets in Europe. It transferred him from his study in Lund to the bishop's palace in Växjö; it marked the first breakdown of his health, which had hitherto been excellent; and it witnessed a singular moral crisis in the inner history of the poet, about which much has been written, but of which little is known. Tegnér was at this time passionately in love with a certain beautiful Euphrosyne Palm, the wife of a town councillor in Lund, and this unfortunate passion, while it inspired much of his finest poetry, turned the poet's blood to gall. From this time forward the heartlessness of woman is one of Tegnér's principal themes.

Bishop's seat 
It is a remarkable sign of the condition of Sweden at that time that a man without a Christian heritage, and with little interest in formal religious matters, should be offered and should accept a bishop's crosier. He did not hesitate in accepting it: it was a great honour; he was poor; and he was anxious to get away from Lund. No sooner, however, had he began to study for his new duties than he began to regret the step he had taken. It was nevertheless too late to go back, and Tegnér made a respectable bishop as long as his health lasted. In 1835, he was elected a member of the Royal Swedish Academy of Sciences. But he became moody and melancholy; as early as 1833 he complained of fiery heats in his brain, and in 1840, during a visit to Stockholm, he suddenly became insane.

Mental deterioration
He was sent to an asylum in Schleswig, and early in 1841 he was cured, and able to return to Växjö. In later years Tegnér began, but left unfinished, two important epic poems, Gerda and Kronbruden. It was during his convalescence in Schleswig that he composed Kronbruden. He wrote no more of importance; in 1843 he had a stroke of apoplexy, and on 2 November 1846 he died in Växjö.

Tegnérmuseet
Tegnérmuseet is a museum devoted exclusively to the life and work of Esaias Tegnér. The museum is located in the house where Esaias Tegnèr  lived with his family from 1813 to 1826   in the city center of Lund. Since 1997, the museum has been part of the foundation Kulturen, which also operates the open-air museum in Lund.

Notes

References
  This work in turn cites:
 C. W. Böttiger, Teckning af Tegnérs Lefnad (Swedish)
 Georg Brandes, Esaias Tegnér (1878)
 Johan Henrik Thomander, Tankar och Löjen (Swedish, 1876)

English
Axel, from the Swedish of Bishop Tegnér, adapted by Magnus Bernhard. Buffalo, N.Y., 1915 F.W. Burow's Sons (revised).
Ahlberg, Fred: Masterpieces of Swedish Poetry. Tujunga, CA., 1952, C.L. Anderson.
Bellquist, John Eric. Tegnér's First Romantic Poem. Scandinavica 31, no. 1 (May 1992).
Boyesen, Hjalmar Hjorth. Esaias Tegnér. in Essays on Scandinavian Literature. Reprint. New York 1911, Charles Scribner's Sons.
Gustavsson, Lars: Forays into Swedish Poetry. Austin 1978, Univ. of Texas Press.
Locock, C. D.: Fritiof's Saga. London 1924, G. Allen & Unwin.

External links

 Frithiofs saga af Esaias Tegnér
 
 
  

Charles XII: on the centenary of his death 1818 The original Swedish text, as well as parallel translations by J.E.D.Bethune (1848) and Charles Harrison-Wallace (1998) and a comment by the latter.
 The Correspondence of Esaias Tegnér Digitised letters to Tegnér at Lund University Library (in Swedish)
The Children of the Lord's Supper Tr. by Henry Wadsworth Longfellow.

1782 births
1846 deaths
People from Säffle Municipality
Writers from Värmland
Bishops of Växjö
Swedish-language writers
Swedish poets
Swedish male writers
Lund University alumni
Members of the Swedish Academy
Members of the Royal Swedish Academy of Sciences
Swedish male poets
19th-century Swedish poets
19th-century male writers